Maxwell Arnold Deacon (March 22, 1910 – April 29, 1970) was a Canadian ice hockey player who competed in the 1936 Winter Olympics. Deacon was a member of the 1936 Port Arthur Bearcats, which won the silver medal for Canada in ice hockey at the 1936 Winter Olympics. In 1987 he was inducted into the Northwestern Ontario Sports Hall of Fame as a member of that Olympic team.

References

External links
profile

1910 births
1970 deaths
Ice hockey players at the 1936 Winter Olympics
Olympic ice hockey players of Canada
Olympic silver medalists for Canada
Olympic medalists in ice hockey
Medalists at the 1936 Winter Olympics